Pulham Market was a railway station on the Waveney Valley Line in Norfolk, England. It was closed for passengers in 1953.

References

External links
 Pulham Market station o 1946 O. S. map

Disused railway stations in Norfolk
Former Great Eastern Railway stations
Railway stations in Great Britain opened in 1855
Railway stations in Great Britain closed in 1953